The 2009 Men's Youth World Handball Championship (3rd tournament) took place in Tunisia from July 20–July 31.

Croatia is the 2009 Men’s Youth World Champion, after beating Iceland in the final with 40:35.

Venues

Preliminary round

Group A

Group B

Group C

Group D

Placement matches

17th–20th

19th/20th

17th/18th

13th–16th

15th/16th

13th/14th

9th–12th

11th/12th

9th/10th

Final round

Quarterfinals

5th–8th

Semifinals

7th/8th

5th/6th

Bronze medal match

Gold medal match

Final standings

All-star team
During the victory ceremony the best actors of the tournament were announced. The following players earned a nomination to the tournament's All-Star Team:
Goalkeeper: 
Left wing: 
Left back: 
Pivot: 
Centre back: 
Right back: 
Right wing:

References

External links

International handball competitions hosted by Tunisia
Men's Youth World Handball Championship
World
World Handball Championship youth and junior tournaments